The Savage Five, also known as The Savage 5, is a 1974 Hong Kong martial arts film written and directed by Chang Cheh and starring David Chiang, Ti Lung, Chen Kuan-tai, Danny Lee and Wong Chung. The film's Chinese title literally means the "Five Tiger Generals".

Plot
A group of bandits flees with a stolen safe to a small town where they oppress the villagers and forces the town's blacksmith Wei Min-hui (Danny Lee) to unlock the safe. Wei refuses to help the bandits and after he informed the mayor about this, he reports to the officials in a nearby village. The bandits were furious that Wei has fled away and starts killing the villagers, threatening them they will kill a villager every hour if they do not find Wei. Finally, the heroes of the town come forward to wipe out the bandits. At this time, Wei also brings a government official to town, who unexpectedly turns out to be an accomplice of the bandits.

Cast
David Chiang as Chen Deng / Chen San
Ti Lung as Fang Yi-fei
Chen Kuan-tai as Ma Dao
Danny Lee as Wei Min-hui
Wong Chung as Yao Guang
Wai Wang as Brother Li
Wong Ching as Bandit leader
Chinag Tao as Liang Shan
Wong Bing-bing as San Niang
Lo Dik as Mayor Yuen
Wang Kuang-yu as Bandit
Norman Chui as Dai Niu
Ngai Fei as villager
Lee Sau-kei as villager
Lee Pang-fei as villager
Shum Lo as villager
Wong Ching-ho as villager
Liu Wai as villager
Lam Fai-wong as villager
Jamie Luk as villager
Stephen Yip as villager
Lee Yung-kit as villager
Yuen Man-tzu as village girl
Kot Dik-wah as village girl
Johnson Wong as Bandit
 as Bandit
Yen Shi-kwan as Bandit
Chan Dik-hak as Bandit
Lau Chun-fai as Bandit
Ng Yuen-fan as Bandit
Tung Choi Bo as Bandit
Law Keung as Bandit
Danny Chow as Bandit
Wong Mei as Bandit
Tang Tak-cheung as Bandit
Chik Nga-hung as Bandit
Huang Ha as Bandit
Chui Fat as Bandit
Cheung Siu-lun as Villager
Wa Lun as Young villager
Ting Tung as Villager
Ho Bo-sing
Chan Siu-gai
Choi Lam
Tam Ying
Yuen Shun-yi
Fung Hak-on
Hsu Hsia
Yeung Pak-chan
Wong Chi-keung
Kong Chuen
Ho Kei-cheung
Ho Hon-chau as Villager
Ling Hon
Wong Kung-miu

External links

The Savage Five at Hong Kong Cinemagic

1974 films
1974 martial arts films
1970s action thriller films
1970s martial arts films
Hong Kong action thriller films
Hong Kong martial arts films
Kung fu films
1970s Mandarin-language films
Films directed by Chang Cheh
Shaw Brothers Studio films
Films set in China
Films shot in Hong Kong
1970s Hong Kong films